Scott William Forrest (born 6 August 1984) is a Scottish retired rugby union player who competed in rugby sevens at 2010 Commonwealth Games, serving as captain of the national team at the event. He is the head coach of the Scotland Women 7s squad and the Great Britain Women 7s team for the 2020 Tokyo Olympics.

Early life
Forrest was born in Rutherglen. He attended West Coats Primary School (Cambuslang) and Hamilton College, then studied sport and exercise science at the University of Strathclyde.

Rugby career

Playing
He started playing for Cambuslang at the age of eight years. He was attached to Glasgow Warriors from 2005, but made his professional debut for Border Reivers in 2007 shortly before the club folded, at which point he signed a 7s contract with Scotland, but was still affiliated with the Warriors.

He represented Scotland at under-19 level while playing for Cambuslang, and at under-21 level while with Glasgow Hawks.

In Sevens, Forrest became involved in Scotland squads in 2006, playing in 30 World Rugby Sevens Series tournaments from the 2005–06 World Sevens Series onwards. Despite breaking an ankle playing 15s rugby in November 2008, he returned to take part in the 2009 Rugby World Cup Sevens in Dubai the following March, leading his nation to victory in the Plate (the second-tier competition for those who did not progress in the primary Cup), then achieving rare semi-final placings at the 2009 London Sevens and 2009 Edinburgh Sevens World Series events.

In September 2010 it was revealed that he would captain the Scotland Sevens team at the 2010 Commonwealth Games sevens competition in Delhi, which he later described as the highlight of his career. After the event (in which Scotland placed sixth overall, losing the Plate final to Samoa), Forrest announced his retirement from playing at the age of 26 on account of long-term injury. He took a post as rugby development officer in Inverclyde.

Coaching
From 2012 Forrest coached the First XV at Cambuslang, then in May 2014 moved to Premiership side Ayr, where he had also been a player, to become the club's backs specialist.

In April 2012 he became the coach for the new Scotland Women 7s squad that were scheduled to compete in a FIRA-AER tournament in Belgium in June 2012. After five years in the role, in 2017 he stepped down and was replaced by Scott Wight. He then worked as a performance lifestyle adviser at the Sportscotland Institute of Sport, before returning to Scottish Rugby in late 2018 to take up the position of Women's High Performance Manager, 7s Head Coach and 15s Assistant Coach.

Club honours
Glasgow Hawks
Scottish Premiership: 2003-04, 2004–05, 2005–06
Scottish Cup: 2003–04

Ayr
Scottish Premiership: 2008–09

Currie
Scottish Premiership: 2009–10

References

External links
 Profile at Scottish Rugby
 Profile at SportScotland
 Profile at GlasgowWarriors.com

1984 births
Living people
Alumni of the University of Strathclyde
Ayr RFC players
Border Reivers players
Cambuslang RFC players
Coaches of international rugby sevens teams
Commonwealth Games rugby sevens players of Scotland
Currie RFC players
Glasgow Hawks players
Glasgow Warriors players
Hawick RFC players
People educated at Hamilton College, South Lanarkshire
Rugby union players from Rutherglen
Rugby sevens players at the 2010 Commonwealth Games
Scottish rugby union coaches
Scottish rugby union players
Sportspeople from Cambuslang
Women's rugby union in Scotland